The 2021–22 season was the 55th season in the existence of AZ Alkmaar and the club's 24th consecutive season in the top flight of Dutch football. In addition to the domestic league, AZ Alkmaar participated in this season's editions of the KNVB Cup, the UEFA Europa League and the UEFA Europa Conference League.

Players

First-team squad

Out on loan

Other players under contract

Transfers

In

Out

Pre-season and friendlies

Competitions

Overall record

Eredivisie

League table

Results summary

Results by round

Matches
The league fixtures were announced on 11 June 2021.

European competition play-offs

KNVB Cup

UEFA Europa League

Play-off round
The draw for the play-off round was held on 2 August 2021.

UEFA Europa Conference League

Group stage

The draw for the group stage was held on 27 August 2021.

Knockout phase

Round of 16 
The draw for the round of 16 was held on 25 February 2022.

References

AZ Alkmaar seasons
AZ Alkmaar
2021–22 UEFA Europa League participants seasons
2021–22 UEFA Europa Conference League participants seasons